David Sproxton,  (born 6 January 1954) is a British entrepreneur, best known as one of the co-founders, with Peter Lord, of the Aardman Animations studio. Sproxton was appointed a Commander of the Order of the British Empire (CBE) on 17 June 2006.

Education and career
David graduated from Collingwood College, Durham University before starting as an animator, producing segments for the Vision On TV program, Sproxton and Lord created the character of Morph for Take Hart (which featured Tony Hart, the artist from Vision On).

He is credited as the cinematographer for the BAFTA Award nominated War Story, and the Oscar nominated Adam, as well as the Oscar-winning Creature Comforts directed by Nick Park.
Other production credits include Chicken Run, Wallace & Gromit: The Curse of the Were-Rabbit and Arthur Christmas.

In May 2006, Sproxton (along with Peter Lord) visited the "Aardman Exhibit" at the Ghibli Museum in Mitaka, Tokyo, Japan, where he met Hayao Miyazaki. Miyazaki has long been a fan of the Aardman Animation works.

References

External links

 

Aardman Animations people
British animators
British television producers
Commanders of the Order of the British Empire
Alumni of Collingwood College, Durham
Living people
British animated film producers
1954 births
Clay animators
British animated film directors
British film directors